Michael Smith or Mike Smith may refer to:

Arts 
Michael E. Smith (artist) (born 1977), American sculptor
Michael Paul Smith (born 1950), American artist and photographer
Michael Smith (performance artist) (born 1951), American performance artist

Entertainment

Film and television
Michael Bailey Smith (born 1957), American film and television actor
Mike Smith (actor) (born 1972), Canadian actor, screenwriter, comedian and musician
Michael Smith (director), American film and television series director
Valentine Michael Smith, chief character in Stranger in a Strange Land

Music
Michael Joseph Smith (born 1938), American classical composer and pianist
Michael Peter Smith (1941–2020), American songwriter and performer
Michael S. Smith (drummer) (1946–2006), American jazz drummer
Michael W. Smith (born 1957), American Christian singer and musician
Michael L. Smith (born 1953), known as Michael Lovesmith, American R&B musician, producer and executive
Mike Smith (jazz saxophonist) (born 1957), American jazz saxophonist
Mike Smith (singer-songwriter) (born 1939), American singer-songwriter
Mike Smith (Paul Revere & the Raiders) (born 1942), American drummer best known as a member of Paul Revere & the Raiders
Mike Smith (Dave Clark Five) (1943–2008), English singer-songwriter
Mike Smith (drummer) (born 1970), American drummer for Suffocation
Mike Smith (guitarist) (born 1973), American guitarist for Limp Bizkit
Mike Smith (record producer), Cuban American record producer and musician
Mike Smith (saxophonist), English saxophonist for The Ailerons
Mike Smith (born 1947), Welsh saxophonist (Amen Corner)

Other entertainment
M. G. Smith (Michael G. Smith, 1921–1993), Jamaican poet and social anthropologist
Michael Smith (poet) (1942–2014), Irish poet and translator
Michael Smith (author) (born 1946), British author and journalist
Mikey Smith (1954–1983), Jamaican dub poet and performance artist
Michael Marshall Smith (born 1965), English novelist and screenwriter
Michael Smith (chef) (born 1966), American born celebrity chef residing in Canada
Michael V. Smith, Canadian novelist, poet and filmmaker
Michael Farris Smith, American writer
Mike Prestwood Smith, sound mixer
Mike Smith (music executive), managing director of Columbia Records UK

Politics
Michael Brackett Smith (1936–2021), American diplomat and trade negotiator
M. Hoke Smith (1855–1931), American politician
Michael Smith (Irish politician) (born 1940), Irish politician
Carl Michael Smith (born 1944), known as Mike, former Oklahoma Secretary of Energy
Mike Smith (Louisiana politician) (born 1948), former Louisiana state senator, member of the Long family
Michael F. Smith, member of the Delaware House of Representatives
Michael Keith Smith (1953–2010), chairman of United Kingdom pressure group, the Conservative Democratic Alliance
Michael K. Smith (Illinois politician) (1966–2014), former member of the Illinois House of Representatives
Michael K. Smith (Vermont official), secretary of human services for the state of Vermont, 2006–2008
Mike Smith (Nova Scotia politician), mayor of Colchester County, Nova Scotia, Canada
Michael Adye Smith (1886–1965), Australian politician
Michael Smith (Georgia politician) (born 1983), member of the Georgia House of Representatives

Journalism
Michael Townsend Smith (born 1935), theatre critic, music and dance critic, and playwright
Michael Smith (newspaper reporter) (born 1952), reporter for The Sunday Times
Mike Smith (broadcaster) (1955–2014), English television and radio presenter
Michael Smith (Irish journalist) (born 1965)
Michael Smith (writer) (born 1976), English writer and broadcaster
Michael Smith (sports reporter) (born 1979), American sports reporter for The Boston Globe and ESPN
Michael Smith (American journalist), American journalist for Bloomberg News
Michael David Smith, American sportswriter

Religion
Michael Percival Smith (1924–2013), Archdeacon of Maidstone, 1979–1989
Michael Smith (bishop) (born 1940), Catholic Bishop of Meath, Ireland
Michael G. Smith (born 1955), Episcopal Bishop of North Dakota, United States

Science
Michael Smith (chemist) (1932–2000), Canadian Nobel Prize–winning chemist 
Michael J. Smith (1945–1986), American astronaut
Michael E. Smith (archaeologist) (born 1953), American archaeologist and Mesoamerica scholar
Michael D. Smith (computer scientist), dean of the Faculty of Arts and Sciences at Harvard University
Michael D. Smith (economist), information technology and marketing professor
C. Michael Smith (born 1950), clinical psychologist and scholar

Sports

American football
Mike Smith (American football coach) (born 1959), former head coach of the NFL Atlanta Falcons
Mike Smith (linebacker) (born 1981), former NFL linebacker, current coach for the NFL Minnesota Vikings
Michael Smith (running back) (born 1988), American football running back who is currently a free agent
Michael Smith (American football coach), American football coach in the United States
Mike Smith (wide receiver) (born 1958), former NFL wide receiver

Association football
Mike Smith (footballer, born 1935) (1935–2013), English defender for Derby County and Bradford City
Mike Smith (football manager) (1937–2021), manager of Egypt and Wales national football teams and of Hull City
Mick Smith (footballer) (born 1958), English defender who played for Wimbledon and others
Michael Smith (footballer, born 1988), Northern Irish footballer who plays for Heart of Midlothian
Michael Smith (footballer, born 1991), English professional footballer who plays for Rotherham United

Baseball
Mike Smith (1890s outfielder) (1868–1945), MLB outfielder from 1886 to 1901
Mike Smith (1920s outfielder) (1904–1981), MLB outfielder who played in the 1926 season
Mike Smith (pitcher, born 1961), National League pitcher from 1984 to 1989
Mike Smith (pitcher, born 1963), American League pitcher from 1989 to 1990
Mike Smith (infielder) (born 1969), Rotary Smith Award winner
Mike Smith (2000s pitcher) (born 1977), MLB pitcher in the 2000s

Basketball
Mike Smith (basketball, born 1963), former professional basketball player from the University of South Carolina-Spartanburg
Michael Smith (basketball, born 1965), former BYU and Boston Celtics player, and former Los Angeles Clippers television and radio commentator
Michael Smith (basketball, born 1972), former NBA player from Washington, D.C.
Mike Smith (basketball, born 1976), professional basketball player from West Monroe, Louisiana
Mike Smith (basketball, born 1987), professional basketball player from East Tennessee State University
Mike Smith (basketball, born 1997), college basketball player for the Michigan Wolverines

Cricket
M. J. K. Smith (born 1933), English cricketer and rugby union player
Michael J. Smith (cricketer) (1942–2004), cricketer who played for Middlesex CCC and England
Mike Smith (Australian cricketer) (born 1973), Australian cricketer
Mike Smith (Scottish cricketer) (born 1966), Scottish cricketer
Mike Smith (cricketer, born 1967), Gloucestershire CCC and England cricketer
Michael Smith (Oxfordshire cricketer), English cricketer
Michael Smith (South African cricketer) (born 1980), South African cricketer

Other sports
Michael Smith (Australian footballer) (born 1959), Australian rules footballer
Michael Smith (rugby league), in the 1960s, and 1970s for Featherstone Rovers and Huddersfield
Mike Smith (rugby league), in the 1970s, and 1980s for Great Britain and Hull Kingston Rovers
Michael Smith (rugby league, born 1976), in the 1990s and 2000s for North Harbour, New Zealand, Canterbury Bulldogs
Michael Smith (rugby union) (born 1998), Canadian rugby union player
Michael Smith (ice hockey) (born 1971), Canadian ice hockey defenseman
Mike Smith (ice hockey, born 1945), general manager for Winnipeg Jets and Chicago Blackhawks
Mike Smith (ice hockey, born 1982), Canadian goaltender for the Edmonton Oilers
Michael Smith (wrestler) (born 1963), American professional wrestler
Mike E. Smith (born 1965), American jockey
Mike Smith (decathlete) (born 1967), Canadian decathlete
Michael Smith (darts player) (born 1990), English darts player
Michael Smith (canoeist), British slalom canoeist
Mike Smith (softball), head coach of the California Baptist Lancers softball team

Others
Michael Smith (diplomat) (19362021), American diplomat and trade negotiator
Michael Smith (judge) (1740–1809), Irish judge
Michael Babington Smith (1901–1984), British banker, sportsman, and soldier
Mike Sharwood Smith (born 1942), linguist
Michael John Smith (espionage) (born 1948), British Cold War spy
Michael A. Smith (born 1954), philosopher at Princeton University
Michael S. Smith (interior designer) (born 1964), American interior designer
Michael Acton Smith (born 1974), CEO of Mind Candy
Michael S. Smith II, counter-terrorism advisor to members of the United States Congress
Michael J. Smith, U.S. army sergeant, dog handler convicted for prisoner abuse at Abu Ghraib prison
Michael Smith (police officer), police sergeant killed during the 2016 shooting of Dallas police officers
Michael Smith (aviator) (born 1968), Australian aviator
Michael Smith, founder, chairman, and CEO of Freeport LNG

See also
Michael Smyth (disambiguation)